Cribraria elegans is a species of slime molds. It is found in the United States, Europe (including France) and Japan.

References

External links 

 
 Cribraria elegans at Mycobank.org

Species described in 1873
Myxogastria